Marieta Ilcu (born October 16, 1962 in Darabani, Botoşani) is a retired Romanian long jumper. In 1989 she won a silver medal at the World Indoor Championships, and jumped 7.08 metres in June. This would remain her personal best. In 1993 she celebrated her greatest sporting triumph as she won the World Indoor Championships.

Achievements

External links
 
 

1962 births
Living people
People from Darabani
Romanian female long jumpers
Athletes (track and field) at the 1992 Summer Olympics
Olympic athletes of Romania
European Athletics Championships medalists
Universiade medalists in athletics (track and field)
Universiade gold medalists for Romania
World Athletics Indoor Championships medalists
World Athletics Indoor Championships winners
Medalists at the 1987 Summer Universiade
Medalists at the 1985 Summer Universiade
Medalists at the 1989 Summer Universiade